Over 80 species of ants can be found in Sweden, distributed across 21 genera belonging to four subfamilies.

Genera

 Dolichoderinae
 Linepithema
 Tapinoma
 Technomyrmex

 Formicinae
 Camponotus
 Formica
 Lasius
 Paratrechina
 Polyergus

 Myrmicinae
 Anergates
 Formicoxenus
 Harpagoxenus
 Leptothorax
 Monomorium
 Myrmecina
 Myrmica
 Solenopsis
 Stenamma
 Temnothorax
 Tetramorium
 Strongylognathus

 Ponerinae
 Hypoponera

Species

Endangered species
The Red List of the Swedish Species Information Center at the Swedish University of Agricultural Sciences lists two species as near threatened and six threatened: three endangered and three critically endangered. One species, Camponotus vagus, is extinct in Sweden, but is still widespread in Central Europe.

 Near Threatened (NT)
Myrmica specioides
Temnothorax interruptus

 Endangered (EN)
Lasius bicornis
Solenopsis fugax
Strongylognathus testaceus

 Critically Endangered (CR)
Camponotus fallax
Polyergus rufescens
Leptothorax goesswaldi

 Extinct in Sweden (Regionally Extinct; RE)
Camponotus vagus

Notes

References

Sweden
Ants
Sweden, ants
Sweden